Alpha Boucher (14 November 1943 – 14 December 2020) was a Canadian actor.

Biography
Boucher was accepted into the Conservatoire de Québec in 1961 alongside his friend, Jean-Yves Gaudreault. He graduated in 1965.

Alpha Boucher died in Lévis on 14 December 2020 at the age of 77.

Filmography

Moi et l'autre (1966)
Sol et Gobelet (1968)
La Paradis terrestre (1968)
Quelle famille! (1969)
Mont-Joye (1970)
Les Berger (1970)
Symphorien (1970)
Tiens-toi bien après les oreilles à papa (1971)
L'Amour en communauté (1971)
Comme tout le monde (1972)
Les Forges de Saint-Maurice (1973)
Pris au collet (1974)
Bingo (1974)
Les Beaux Dimanches (1974)
La Petite Patrie (1974)
Y'a pas de problème (1975)
The Winner (1975)
Pousse mais pousse égal (1975)
Les As (1977)
Les Brillant (1980)
Boogie-woogie 47 (1980)
Scandale (1982)
Lucien Brouillard (1983)
Terre humaine (1983)
Entre chien et loup (1984)
Semi-détaché (1987)
Celui qui l'dit, c'est lui qui l'est ! (1992)
Alys Robi (1995)
Sous le signe du lion (1997)

References

1943 births
2020 deaths
Canadian male film actors
Acadian people
People from Edmundston
Male actors from New Brunswick